Pichit Island is one of the many uninhabited Canadian arctic islands in Qikiqtaaluk Region, Nunavut. Other islands in the immediate vicinity include Crimmins Island, Frobisher's Farthest, Jenvey Island, Kudlago Island, and Sybil Island.

References 

Uninhabited islands of Qikiqtaaluk Region
Islands of Baffin Island
Islands of Frobisher Bay